Eris most often refers to:
 Eris (dwarf planet)

Eris may also refer to:

Fictional characters
 Eris Vanserra, the eldest son of Beron, the High Lord of the Autumn Court from the A Court of Thorns and Roses series 
 Eris Morn, a character from the Destiny video game series
 Eris the Deceiver, a character from The Grim Adventures of Billy & Mandy
 Eris, a character from Star Trek Deep Space Nine episode "The Jem'Hadar"
 Eris, a character in Sinbad: Legend of the Seven Seas
 Eris, a character from the Asobi ni Iku yo!
 Eris, a character in Drakengard 2
 Eris, a character from Lego's Legends of Chima theme
 Eris Boreas Greyrat, a character in Mushoku Tensei

Other uses
 Eris (confection), a traditional confection of Tabriz
 Eris (fictional planet), a fictional planet in Damocles and its successor Mercenary III
 Eris (spider), a genus of jumping spiders
 Eris (simulation), a simulation of the Milky Way
 Eris, Ohio, a community in the United States
 Exoatmospheric Reentry-vehicle Interceptor Subsystem, a project of the Strategic Defense Initiative
 Stimulator of interferon genes, a protein that in humans is encoded by the TMEM173 gene
 The HTC Droid Eris, a variant of the HTC Hero mobile phone

People with the given name
 Eris Abedini (born 1998), Swiss professional footballer
 Eris O'Brien (1895-1974), Australian prelate of the Catholic Church and historian
 Eris Paton (1928-2004), New Zealand cricketer

See also
 Aeris (disambiguation)
 EFnet or Eris-Free network, an Internet Relay Chat (IRC) network
 Eriş

Unisex given names